Milford Station (pop. 1,000) is a village in Nova Scotia, Canada. It is located in the East Hants municipal district  in the Shubenacadie Valley.

The community is home to the largest open-pit gypsum mine in the world.

History
Milford Station was originally named Wickwires after its original settlers, however John Wardrope suggested the new name in 1860 because of the presence of various mills in the vicinity.  In 1857 the Nova Scotia Railway mainline from Richmond to Truro opened, passing through the community along the west bank of the Shubenacadie River, hence the term "station" in the community's name.

Milford Station is primarily a service centre for local farming communities, although given its location along Highway 102, it has a growing residential population and is exhibiting exurban characteristics. Milford Station has an abundance of dairy cattle conceiving a 9:1 population to that of people.

Education
Milford Station has two schools:

 Riverside Education Centre (gr.6-8)
 Hants East Rural High School (gr. 9–12)

References
Explore HRM
Destination Nova Scotia
Nova Scotia Place Names

Communities in Hants County, Nova Scotia
Mining communities in Nova Scotia